CK Transit (branded as Ride CK) provides the conventional bus transportation in Chatham-Kent, Ontario, Canada.

There are five local bus routes within the urban boundaries of the old City of Chatham. Routes 1 through 4 provide services every 30 minutes Monday through Saturday, while route 5 runs on a 45-minute basis. For rail passengers, bus route 3 stops nearest Via Rail Chatham station, at the intersection of Park Avenue West and Pine Street.

CK Transit also provides bus service to outlying communities in Chatham-Kent. In October 2007, Route A, linking Chatham, Wallaceburg and Dresden, with four trips Monday through Saturday, was introduced.

Interurban service was expanded to include Route D, linking Chatham to Tilbury and Wheatley in January 2009, and Route C, serving Blenheim and Ridgetown in January 2010.

Chatham Specialized Transit Service is a personalized curb-to-curb transportation service for persons who are unable to board the Chatham Conventional public transit system.

City transit routes
1 (Blue) - Downtown to St. Clair College via Grand Avenue, McNaughton Avenue, and Sheldon Avenue
2 (Red) - Downtown to North Maple Mall via St. Clair Street, McHenry Road, and Grand Avenue
3 (Green) - Downtown to Indian Creek Road via Sass Road, John Street, and Tweedsmuir Avenue
4 (Orange) - Downtown to Park Avenue via King Street, Richmond Street, and Lacroix Street
5 "Round the River" - travels both sides of the Thames River, from Princess Street in the east to Bloomfield Rd in the southwest

Inter-community routes
A - Chatham-Wallaceburg-Dresden
C - Chatham-Blenheim-Ridgetown
D - Chatham-Tilbury-Southwest Kent

See also

 Public transport in Canada

References 

Transit agencies in Ontario
Transport in Chatham-Kent